The 2023 FIBA Basketball World Cup qualification for the FIBA Africa region, began in November 2021 and concluded in February 2023. The process determined the five African teams that would participate at the 2023 FIBA World Cup.

Format
The qualification structure is as follows:
First round: The 16 teams were divided into four groups of four teams and played a double round-robin system (home-and-away or two tournaments at a single venue). The three best-placed teams from each group advanced to the second round.
Second round: The twelve teams were divided into two groups of six teams. Each group was formed from teams advancing from two first round groups. All results from the previous round were carried over. The two-best placed teams from each group and the best third-placed team qualified for the World Cup.

Entrants
The 16 teams that have qualified for AfroBasket 2021 participated in the first round of the FIBA Basketball World Cup African qualifiers.

Draw
The draw for the first round was held on 31 August 2021 in Mies, Switzerland.

Seeding
Seedings were announced on 30 August 2021. Teams were seeded based on FIBA rankings. Teams from pots 1 and 4 were drawn to Groups A and B. Teams from pots 2 and 3 were drawn to Groups C and D. Teams from pots 5 and 6 were drawn across the four groups.

First round
Due to the COVID-19 pandemic, the November window was played in a single venue. The same was done for the February and July window.

All times are local.

Group A

Group B

Group C

Group D

Second round
In the second round, the top three teams from each group were placed in a group with three other top teams. Group A was paired with Group C, forming new Group E and Group B with Group D, forming Group F. In Group F all results from the first qualification round, were carried over to the second round. In contrary, due to disqualification of Mali from Group A, in Group E results from the first qualification round against last ranked team of Group B (Central African Republic) were disregarded.

The matches in each window were played in a single venue.

All times are local.

Group E

Group F

Best third placed team
Due to the discqualification of Mali, the games against the last-ranked teams in Groups B and D in the first round are not counted.

Statistical leaders

Player averages
As of August 29, 2022

Team averages

Notes

References

External links
Tournament summary

FIBA Basketball World Cup qualification
2023 FIBA Basketball World Cup